Clem Smith (born 3 February 1996) is a former professional Australian rules footballer who played with Carlton in the Australian Football League (AFL).

Smith attended Wesley College in Perth. He was recruited by Carlton with their third selection and sixtieth overall in the 2014 national draft from the Perth Football Club in the West Australian Football League (WAFL). He made his AFL debut against  in the first game of the 2015 AFL season, starting as the substitute but coming into the field within the first minute after Dale Thomas was substituted off due to injury. He played seven games in his debut season, but failed to play a game in 2016 and was delisted at the end of the season. Then moved to North Albury Football club and became the Wizard. From here he has played really well in the Ovens and Murray Football League, where he was voted strength and conditioning coach of the OakFM Reserve Grade Team of the Year. From long bombs, to 2k19, The Wizard does it all.

Statistics

|- style="background-color: #EAEAEA"
! scope="row" style="text-align:center" | 2015
|
| 25 || 7 || 0 || 0 || 24 || 31 || 55 || 11 || 9 || 0.0 || 0.0 || 3.4 || 4.4 || 7.9 || 1.6 || 1.3
|-
! scope="row" style="text-align:center" | 2016
|
| 25 || 0 || — || — || — || — || — || — || — || — || — || — || — || — || — || —
|- class="sortbottom"
! colspan=3| Career
! 7
! 0
! 0
! 24
! 31
! 55
! 11
! 9
! 0.0
! 0.0
! 3.4
! 4.4
! 7.9
! 1.6
! 1.3
|}

References

External links 
	
		
		
WAFL playing statistics

Living people
1996 births
Carlton Football Club players
Preston Football Club (VFA) players
Perth Football Club players
People educated at Wesley College, Perth
Australian rules footballers from Western Australia
Indigenous Australian players of Australian rules football